The 59th Dan Kolov & Nikola Petrov Tournament, was wrestling event held in Veliko Tarnovo, Bulgaria between 17 and 20 February 2022.

This international tournament included competition in both men's and women's freestyle wrestling and men's Greco-Roman wrestling. This tournament was held in honor of Dan Kolov who was the first European freestyle wrestling champion from Bulgaria and European and World Champion Nikola Petroff.

Event videos
The event aired freely on the Bulgarian Wrestling Federation Live Youtube channel.

Competition schedule
All times are (UTC+2)

Medal table

Team ranking

Medal overview

Men's freestyle

Greco-Roman

Women's freestyle

Participating nations
447 competitors from 35 nations participated.

 (3)
 (16)
 (1)
 (3)
 (13)
 (23)
 (2)
 (63)
 (2)
 (13)
 (2)
 (3)
 (7)
 (46)
 (4)
 (5)
 (4)
 (35)
 (60)
 (13)
 (2)
 (15)
 (20)
 (11)
 (2)
 (3)
 (1)
 (14)
 (2)
 (13)
 (16)
 (3)
 (1)
 (8)
 (18)

References 

2022 in European sport
2022 in sport wrestling
February  2022 sports events in Europe
2022 in Bulgarian sport